Brian Michael Lynch (born June 21, 1973) is an American film and comic book writer. Lynch was the initial writer and co-creator with Joss Whedon of Angel: After the Fall for IDW Publishing, and is best known for writing the screenplays for the films Puss in Boots (2011), Minions (2015), The Secret Life of Pets (2016), The Secret Life of Pets 2 (2019), and Minions: The Rise of Gru (2022). He has also written an unproduced film adaptation of The Sims. In addition to the unproduced Sims film, Lynch also wrote an unproduced film for The Muppets that was titled “The Next Muppet Movie.”

Life and career
Growing up in Middletown Township, New Jersey, Lynch attended Middletown High School South and William Paterson University of New Jersey.

Lynch went to school with (and was friends with) Vincent Pereira, who worked with Kevin Smith at the Quick Stop/RST Video and who inspired Smith's own film career. Despite seeing himself as a writer rather than filmmaker, Lynch contributed in a non-writing capacity to Smith's early films and then wrote/directed one of three non-Smith-directed films under the View Askew label.

Except for four years during early childhood spent in Indiana, Lynch lived in New Jersey all his life. 

In 2004, he moved to Hollywood, California.

Comics and animated series
Lynch has worked on a number of comics and animated series:
Angry Naked Pat (animated series)
Spider-Man Unlimited (vol 3) #1
Monkey Man Unleashed
Patchouli One Shot
Spike: Asylum
Spike: Shadow Puppets
Angel: After the Fall #1–17
Spike: After the Fall
Spike (IDW Publishing)
Teenage Mutant Ninja Turtles: Microseries #1-3 (IDW Publishing)
 Monster Motors: The Curse of Minivan Helsing

Filmography
A Better Place (1997) – Actor (Eddie)
Chasing Amy (1997) – Actor (Bryan White) (uncredited). key craft service, (miscellaneous crew)
Big Helium Dog (1999) – Director, Writer, Editor, Miscellaneous Crew. Actor (Director's Assistant)
Jay and Silent Bob Strike Back (2001) – Actor (Comic Book Shopper #1) (uncredited)
Hop (2011) – Writer with Cinco Paul and Ken Daurio
Puss in Boots (2011) – Story with Will Davies and Tom Wheeler
Despicable Me: Minion Mayhem (2012) - Writer
Minions (2015) - Writer
Binky Nelson Unpacified (2015) - Writer/Director
The Secret Life of Pets (2016) - Writer with Cinco Paul and Ken Daurio
The Secret Life of Pets 2 (2019) - Writer
Minions: The Rise of Gru (2022) - Story with Matthew Fogel
DC League of Super-Pets (2022) - Co-producer

References

External links

1973 births
Living people
American comics writers
American male film actors
Male actors from New Jersey
Middletown High School South alumni
People from Middletown Township, New Jersey
Film directors from New Jersey
William Paterson University alumni
Illumination (company) people